Bernocchi is an Italian surname. Notable people with the surname include:

Antonio Bernocchi (1859–1930), business magnate and philanthropist
Eraldo Bernocchi (born c. 1963), Italian musician
Piero Bernocchi (born 1947), Italian trade unionist, writer and politician

See also
Coppa Bernocchi, bicycle race in Legnano, Italy

Italian-language surnames